Gunma 3rd district was a constituency of the House of Representatives in the Diet of Japan (national legislature). Between 1947 and 1993 it elected four representatives by single non-transferable vote. As of 1993, it comprised the cities of Takasaki, Shibukawa, Fujioka, Tomioka, Annaka and the Gunma, Kitagunma, Tano, Kanra, Usui and Agatsuma districts.

The district was a traditional "conservative kingdom" (hoshu-ōkoku), a stronghold of the Liberal Democratic Party (LDP) and its predecessors. It was, most notably, represented by several faction leaders and later prime ministers:
 Yasuhiro Nakasone, Takeo Fukuda and later his son Yasuo – all three prime ministers – from the conservative anti-mainstream (Democratic Party, Progressive Party, Hatoyama faction) and
 Keizo Obuchi and previously his father Mitsuhei from the conservative mainstream (Democratic Liberal Party, Liberal Party, Yoshida faction).

With only two exceptions Gunma's 3rd district was represented by three conservatives and one candidate from the Japan Socialist Party (JSP). Tsuruo Yamaguchi, in the 1980s JSP secretary-general, was elected eleven times between 1960 and 1993, never receiving the most votes and ranking second only once in 1990.

Summary of results during the 1955 party system

Elected Representatives

References 

Districts of the House of Representatives (Japan)
Gunma Prefecture